Walter Keller may refer to:

 Walter Keller (athlete), Swiss Olympic sprinter
 Walter Keller (ice hockey), Swiss ice hockey player
 Walter Keller (researcher), American researcher